Tanush is the Albanian variant of the Greek given name Athanasius, loaned from Latin. Where the fricative /θ/ becomes the stop /t/, this shows that the name passed through Latin before entering Albanian; the Greek-derived equivalent is the name and onomastic element Thanas. The Albanian definite form is Tanushi. In Latin, it was written Tanusius, while in Italian Tanussio and Tanusso. It may refer to:

Tanusio Thopia (fl. 1329–38), Angevin Albanian count
Tanush Thopia (died 1467), nobleman
Little Tanush ( 1423–33), nobleman

Tanush is also an onomastic element and appears in the following Albanian language toponyms: 

Tanuše, an Albanian village of the Upper Reka region, Mavrovo and Rostuša Municipality, North Macedonia
Tanuševci, an Albanian village, Čučer-Sandevo Municipality, North Macedonia

See also 
Thanas

References

Albanian masculine given names
Albanian-language surnames